James Rayner Noble (born August 7, 1961) is an American former baseball coach and player. He last served as NCAA Division I college baseball head coach at the University of Houston.  In 13 years of coaching Houston Cougars baseball, he is the winningest coach in Cougars history.  Noble's coaching career record is 526-388. (.581).

A native of Houston, Texas, Noble attended Spring Woods High School and holds both a bachelor's and master's degree from the University of Houston.

From 1983 to 1987, Noble played Minor League Baseball in the Houston Astros organization.

Noble wore one of the highest numbers in college baseball (#85, as opposed to his playing #9), which he said he wore to remind himself of becoming a Christian in 1985.

After suffering the first consecutive losing seasons of his career, Noble parted ways with UH on June 4, 2010.

On September 17, 2021, Noble was inducted into the University of Houston Hall of Honor.

Head coaching record

References

External links
 TheBaseballCube.com player stats

1961 births
Living people
Houston Cougars baseball coaches
Houston Cougars baseball players
Rice Owls baseball coaches
All-American college baseball players
Baseball players from Houston
People from Foard County, Texas